Samuel Webster Agee, Sr (October 21, 1915 – November 2, 2006) was a professional American football player who played running back for four seasons for the Chicago Cardinals.  He was born in Courtland, Alabama in October 1915.

He went to high school at Columbia Military Academy in Tennessee. He died in Sparta, Tennessee.

References

1915 births
2006 deaths
American football running backs
Chicago Cardinals players
Vanderbilt Commodores football players
People from Lawrence County, Alabama